Dennis Strandberg (born 30 June 1993 in Helsingborg) is a Swedish racing driver, currently competing in the British Touring Car Championship for Team Parker Racing with Maximum Motorsport and the Scandinavian Touring Car Championship for Lestrup Racing Team.

Racing record

Career summary

† As Strandberg was a guest driver, he was ineligble to score points.

Complete Scandinavian Touring Car Championship results
(key) (Races in bold indicate pole position) (Races in italics indicate fastest lap)

Complete British Touring Car Championship results
(key) (Races in bold indicate pole position – 1 point awarded just in first race; races in italics indicate fastest lap – 1 point awarded all races; * signifies that driver led race for at least one lap – 1 point given all races)

References

External links
http://www.btcc.net/driver/dennis-strandberg/

1993 births
Living people
Swedish racing drivers
British Touring Car Championship drivers
British GT Championship drivers
Ginetta GT4 Supercup drivers
Sportspeople from Helsingborg
GT4 European Series drivers